Stephen Eric Brodie (born 14 January 1973 in Sunderland, England) is a retired English professional footballer, who most notably played for Sunderland. He currently works as General Manager for David Lloyd Leisure in Cheshire Oaks (Ellesmere Port).

References

External links

This is Cheshire profile

1973 births
Living people
Footballers from Sunderland
English footballers
Association football forwards
Sunderland A.F.C. players
Doncaster Rovers F.C. players
Scarborough F.C. players
Swansea City A.F.C. players
Chester City F.C. players
Nuneaton Borough F.C. players
Forest Green Rovers F.C. players
Leigh Genesis F.C. players
English Football League players
National League (English football) players
Witton Albion F.C. players
Stalybridge Celtic F.C. players
Droylsden F.C. players